One Nite Alone... Live! is a live album box set by Prince and The New Power Generation, containing live recordings from the intimate One Nite Alone... Tour performances. The album was released in 2002 but many of the tracks were new arrangements of songs dating from more than 20 years earlier. It was the first album since the Love Symbol Album in 1992 to be credited to Prince and The New Power Generation. Among the album's highlights are "Sometimes It Snows in April" and "Adore" at the piano, an extended "Joy in Repetition", and an energetic "When U Were Mine".

Overview 
Prince's backing musicians included Sheila E., Maceo Parker, Eric Leeds, Candy Dulfer, Greg Boyer, Renato Neto, John Blackwell, and Rhonda Smith.  The entire album was recorded live from the audio console by Prince's concert sound engineer Scottie Baldwin. Baldwin's essay on the recording process is included in the liner notes.

One Nite Alone... Live! is the first audio document of Prince's concerts and includes tracks from nine different shows from eight venues on the One Nite Alone... Tour. The track list is fairly representative of a typical night's show on the tour, although it misses the cover versions performed regularly on the tour (such as "A Case of You", "Love Rollercoaster", "La-La Means I Love You" and "Sing a Simple Song"), leaving only Prince compositions. The first two CDs contain the main act, the third CD the aftershow.

The album artwork was the first full work by Sam Jennings for Prince.

On May 29, 2020 the album was reissued as Up All Nite with Prince: The One Nite Alone Collection, a 4CD + DVD box set including the original three CDs, the studio album One Nite Alone... and the DVD Live at the Aladdin Las Vegas.

Track listing

Disc 1: Main Act, Part 1
 "Rainbow Children" – 11:46
 "Muse 2 the Pharaoh" – 4:49
 "Xenophobia" – 12:40
 "Extraordinary" – 5:02
 "Mellow" – 4:30
 "1+1+1 Is 3" – 6:05
 "The Other Side of the Pillow" – 4:46
 "Strange Relationship" – 4:13
 "When U Were Mine" – 3:47
 "Avalanche" – 6:04

Disc 2: Main Act, Part 2
 "Family Name" – 7:17
 "Take Me with U" – 2:54
 "Raspberry Beret" – 3:26
 "Everlasting Now" – 7:41
 "One Nite Alone..." – 1:12
 "Adore" – 5:33
 "I Wanna B Ur Lover" – 1:22
 "Do Me, Baby" – 1:56
 "Condition of the Heart (Interlude)" – 0:39
 "Diamonds and Pearls" – 0:41
 "The Beautiful Ones" – 2:10
 "Nothing Compares 2 U" – 3:48
 "Free" – 1:06
 "Starfish and Coffee" – 1:07
 "Sometimes It Snows in April" – 2:41
 "How Come U Don't Call Me Anymore?" – 5:07
 "Anna Stesia" – 13:12

Disc 3: The Aftershow: It Ain't Over!
 "Joy in Repetition" – 10:56
 "We Do This" – 4:42
 Medley: "Just Friends (Sunny)"/"If You Want Me to Stay" – 4:26
 "2 Nigs United 4 West Compton" – 6:15
 "Alphabet Street" – 2:55
 "Peach [Xtended Jam]" – 11:19
 "Dorothy Parker" – 6:17
 "Girls & Boys" – 6:59
 "Everlasting Now (Vamp)" – 1:49

Charts

References 

2002 live albums
Prince (musician) albums
Albums produced by Prince (musician)
NPG Records live albums